Conopsia is a genus of moths in the family Sesiidae.

Species
Conopsia bicolor (Le Cerf, 1917)
Conopsia flavimacula Kallies, 2000
Conopsia lambornella (Durrant, 1914)
Conopsia phoenosoma (Meyrick, 1930)
Conopsia terminiflava Strand, [1913]

References

Sesiidae
Taxa named by Embrik Strand
Moth genera